"Fuck Forever" is a song by English rock band Babyshambles. It was released as a single on 15 August 2005 and is their highest-charting single, peaking at number four on the UK Singles Chart. The song was negatively targeted due to its controversial title and lyrics, but it was eventually released and has become the closing number in the band's live sets. In May 2007, NME placed "Fuck Forever" at number 24 on its list of the "50 Greatest Indie Anthems Ever", while in 2014, the same publication named it the 245th greatest song of all time.

Music video
The video was directed by Jez Murrell. Most of the promotional video for Babyshambles' second single was filmed on location at Spitalfields City Farm in east London, in June 2005.

At the beginning of the video, Kate Moss makes a cameo appearance, which is followed by a segment featuring Patrick Walden talking to a girl in a cinema ticket booth in the style of a foreign film, complete with subtitles and fluttering animated hearts. The farm segment features a sharp suited and booted band milling around miming to the song, miscellaneous farm animals, goats running around, Union Jack–draped and pork pie hat–wearing donkeys and Pete Doherty twirling around wrapped in a Union Jack. The video ends with Walden and the mysterious cinema girl meeting up at the "Victoria Palace Gates," sharing a kiss and romantically wandering off into the distance.

Track listings
UK CD1 
 "Fuck Forever" (original)
 "East of Eden"
 "Babyshamble"
 "Fuck Forever" (video)

UK CD2 
 "Fuck Forever" (original)
 "Monkey Casino"

UK 7-inch single 
A. "Fuck Forever" (original)
B. "Black Boy Lane"

Australian CD single 
 "Fuck Forever" (original)
 "Fuck Forever" (original clean)
 "Black Boy Lane"
 "Monkey Casino"
 "East of Eden"
 "Babyshambles"

Japanese CD single 
 "Fuck Forever" (original version)
 "Black Boy Lane"
 "Monkey Casino"
 "East of Eden"
 "Babyshambles"
 "Fuck Forever" (original version clean)
 "Fuck Forever" (video)

Charts

Release history

References

2005 songs
2005 singles
Babyshambles songs
Rough Trade Records singles
Songs written by Pete Doherty
Song recordings produced by Mick Jones (The Clash)